Kottappuram or Kottapuram may refer to:

 Kottappuram, Kollam
 Kottappuram, Kasaragod
 Kottappuram, Thrissur
 Kottappuram, Paravur, a village in Paravur Municipality of Kollam district